Zaur Rizvanovich Uguev (born 27 March 1995) is a Russian freestyle wrestler who competes at 57 kilograms. He claimed the 2020 Summer Olympic Games gold medal after back-to-back World Championships in 2018 and 2019, as well as a 2020 Individual World Cup title. A four-time Russian National champion, Uguev is also a European Games and European Championship medalist.

Biography
Originally from the village of Chagarotar (Khasavyurt district), of Kumyk ethnicity. Member of the Russian freestyle wrestling team since 2016. Trained under the guidance of Sheme Shemeev.

Wrestling career
Won Tokyo 2020 wrestling finals by defeating Indian wrestler Ravi Kumar Dahiya

2017

2017 Ivan Yarygin
To kick off his 2017 run, Uguev would wrestle at the prestigious event: Ivan Yarygin 2017, held every year, in Krasnoyarsk.  Uguev would ultimately reign successful and win gold, facing off against foes: Magomedrasul Idrisov, Nurtilek Ermekbaev, Aryan Tyutrin and Nariman Israpilov, scheduling a final match against Artem Gebekov - also from Dagestan.  Moreover, Uguev would win by technical-superiority 10-0 and claim his first Yarygin title, as well as a spot on the Russian team heading to the European Championships in Serbia.

Having been successful for the team selection, Uguev wrestled at the 2017 European Wrestling Championships, held in Novi Sad.  Uguev would defeat Vladimir Egorov by the score 5-3, and Andriy Yatsenko by fall, before falling to Giorgi Edisherashvili, representing Azerbaijan by 5-1.  However, since having lost in the semi-final, Uguev was given an automatic shot for a chance at one of the bronze medals, which he was successful in taking - defeating Zoheir El-Quarraque by the score 9-1, and his first European Championship medal.

Russian Nationals 2017
Uguev had his first senior level National Championship in 2017, in Nazran, Ingushetia.  Uguev defeated all five of his opponents; in round of 32 he defeated Ramazan Ferzaliev of Dagestan by technical fall with the score 14–4; in the round of 16 he beat Aryan Tyutrin of Yakutia with a 3–0 score; in the quarterfinals Uguev beat Rasul Mashezov of Crimea by 10-0 technical fall; in the semifinals he beat Dmitry Aksenov of Yakutia by 7–1.  In the final match, he defeated former opponent Artem Grebekov by a score of 3–1, which gave him the opportunity to compete at the 2017 Paris World Championships.

2017 World Wrestling Championships
Despite his youth, relative inexperience and golds at senior level tournaments, Uguev won his spot for the 2017 Edition of the World Championships, where he would get upset by Sandeep Tomar of India, by the score 8-2, eliminating Uguev from the tournament.

2018

2018 Ivan Yarygin
In a repeat of the previous year, Uguev would start his 2018 at the Ivan Yarygin Grand Prix.  Uguev beat Mongolia's Tumentsogt Bold, Yakutian Donduk-ool Kuresh-ool and American representative, Frank Perrelli, which would give him way into the finals, opposing stand-out Ossetian, Azamat Tuskaev.  Having lost to Tuskaev in the past, Uguev was able to win by the score of 4-1, thus taking first place and the gold medal.  With his second Yarygin title, Uguev was again given the opportunity to compete at the 2018 European Championships; although, this time he would face a lot of pressure in his home republic, taking place in Kaspiysk, Dagestan, Russia.

European Championships 2018
At the 2018 European Wrestling Championships, Uguev won his matches in the qualification, quarter-final and semi-final rounds.  In the final match, he wrestled against Giorgi Edisherashvili of Azerbaijan in a rematch of the 2017 Novi Sad European Championships.  Uguev was winning the majority of the match and was up 3-0 going into the final segments of the match; however, with 8 seconds left: Edisherashvili hit a lateral drop and scored 4 points - which gave Edisherashvili the lead with the score of 3–4; Uguev and his team challenged the call and lost it, the match ended with the score 3–5, ultimately winning gold, and Uguev was left with the silver medal,

Russian Nationals 2018
Uguev became the Russian national champion at 57 kg for a second time in August 2018, in Odintsovo, Moscow Oblast.  Uguev beat Muslim Sadulaev of Chechnya by technical fall in the qualification round, he then beat Rasul Masheshov representing Crimea in the quarter-finals, again by technical fall.  In the semi-finals, Uguev beat Ismail Gadzhiev, also representing Dagestan by 3–0, thus advancing Uguev to the final match for a chance to win gold.  Uguev faced Dondook-ul Kuresh-ul of Tuva by 8–1 score, Uguev scored a 4-point suplex in the second period, giving him the 7–1 lead and Kuresh-ool's coaches challenged a call, but failed, thus giving Uguev an extra point and won the match by 8-1 and becoming a two-time Russian National champion.

2018 World Wrestling Championships
With Uguev's first-place victory at Odintsovo 2018, he qualified for the 2018 World Wrestling Championships held in Budapest, Hungary.  In the round of 16, Uguev faced 2012 Olympian, Armenia's Mihran Jaburyan and won by technical superiority 10–0.  In the quarter-final Uguev then faced 2017 U23 Senior World Champion, Reineri Andreu Ortega of Cuba, winning by the score of 6–0, and faced Paris 2017 Senior World Champion, Yuki Takahashi of Japan, whom Uguev defeated by the score 7-2 and advanced Uguev to the finals.  In the final, Uguev faced Bishkek 2018 champion, Kazakhstan's Nurislam Sanayev.  After a close first period with each wrestler scoring a takedown; the second period started out with each wrestler also gaining a step-out point for the score of 3-3; however, Sanayev was penalized for continuously pulling on Uguev's singlet, thus resulting in a score of 4–3 in favor of Uguev, ultimately giving Uguev his first senior world title at 57 kg,

2019

2019 European Games
Despite missing the 2019 edition of the Ivan Yarygin Golden Gran Prix, it was decided that Uguev would be the representative to participate in the 57 kg category at the 2019 European Games, held in Minsk, Belarus.  After winning the first two matches by technical-superiority, Uguev would suffer an upset loss against Azerbaijani representative Mahir Amiraslanov, by the score 3-2.  Despite losing, Uguev would dominate the bronze medal match and win 10-2 over Georgi Vangelov of Bulgaria.

In spite of Uguev's absence at the 2019 Russian National Championships, he would face Aryan Tyutrin for the spot to be able to compete at the World Championships, in Kazakhstan. Uguev would defeat Tyutrin by 10-0 technical-superiority.

2019 World Wrestling Championships
Having won Bronze at the European Games, and beating Tyutrin by technical fall at the summer-camp face-offs, the reigning World Champion, Uguev, was once again eligible to take part in the World Championships in Kazakhstan.  In the round of 32, Uguev was first faced with the opponent who beat him at the European Games - who became the European Games Champion, Mahir Amiraslanov; Uguev defeated Amiraslanov by the score of 4-3 after scoring a takedown in the last 30 seconds; Uguev next faced Mongolian wrestler, Erdenebatyn Bekhbayar, and defeated him by the score of 5–2.  In the quarter-finals, Uguev's opponent was Asian Champion, Reza Atri who was defeated by Uguev with a score of 2–0, advancing Uguev to the semi-finals against Ravi Kumar of India.  Kumar was defeated after getting taken down and hit with a four-point fireman's carry, Uguev would hold on to win with a score of 6–4, advancing Uguev onto the final vs. Turkish wrestler and 2019 European Champion, Süleyman Atlı. Up by a passivity point, going into the second period, Uguev would get exposed by Atlı for two-points from a chest-wrap, Uguev himself would force Atlı's back to the mat, leading 3–2, Atlı was able to reverse position and lead the score of 3*-3 by criteria.  Approximately 10 seconds later after the reset, Uguev would achieve a strong underhook and was able to land a single-leg takedown for two-points going up 5–3; however, Uguev would then score six-points from three gut-wrenches for a score of 11–3.  To finish the match, Uguev would get two-points from a trapped-arm turn for exposure, resulting in a dominating 13-3 technical fall - successfully defending his world title.

2020

2020 Russian National Championships
Given the ongoing pandemic due to Sars-Covid, the overwhelming majority of all sporting events were cancelled worldwide, thus cancelling most wrestling tournaments for that year - including the 2020 Tokyo Olympics.  Despite all of this, the 2020 Russian National Freestyle Wrestling Championships took place in mid-October, as qualification for the Individual World Cup which was announced to take place in December.  Uguev would win three of his matches, all by technical-superiority; defeating Yakutia's Petr Konstantinov and Aleksey Kopylov, then Muslim Sadulaev- which would give him a spot in the final.  Uguev would again meet his rival, Azamat Tuskaev opposing him in the final.  Uguev's positioning proved to be too much, giving Uguev his third Russian National title defeating Tuskaev by 1-1 criteria, and a spot on the team heading to the Individual World Cup.

Individual World Cup
For the fact that there was no formal World Championships in 2020 due to covid, a condensed version was introduced as an alternative tournament: the 2020 Individual World Cup.  Uguev was sent here, and proved to everyone that he was #1 in the World at 57 kg, and would go unscored on.  Uguev first stormed through Moldova's Buruian, and Andreyeu of Belarus, before winning 9-0 over Myrzanazar Uluu from Kyrgyzstan, paving his way into the semi-final match.  In his semi-final, he was met with young Iranian, former two-time Cadet World Champion, and 2021 Junior World Champion, Rahman Amouzad, Uguev would waste no time and won by fall, which would then allow Uguev to wrestle in the final.  Opposing Uguev in the final, was 2021 Olympian, 2019 European Champion, and World Bronze medalist, Arsen Harutyunyan, of Armenia.  Despite Harutyunyan's accomplishments, Uguev would dominate and win by technical-superiority in less than a minute; scoring an ankle-pick to gut-wrench, followed by a single-leg to another two gut-wrenches, making the score 10-0.  Uguev ultimately won gold and first place on the podium without conceding a single point.

2021

2021 Russian National Championships
Since the Tokyo Olympics were postponed in 2020, they were later rescheduled for the Summer of 2021- this meant that the 2021 Russian Nationals would be the final part of the Olympic Team's selection process - where a gold medal would guarantee a spot on the Olympic team.  The favorite at 57 kg was two-time World Champion, Zaur Uguev.  To start his run, Uguev would win by technical superiority over his first two opponents: Umar Khachukaev or the Rostov Oblast, and Abubakar Mutaliev of Dagestan]]- both by the score: 10-0.  In the quarter-final, Uguev would face the first of three Tuvan opponents: Donduk-ool Khuresh-ool, who would fall by the score of 2-1; Belek-ool Kuzhuget by 4-1, which would result in Uguev meeting Nachyn Mongush in the final.  The final between Uguev and Mongush would be an exhilarating and exciting match, with both wrestlers scoring: Uguev would score first due to Mongush's inactivity and then a push-out, shortly after a takedown was scored for Uguev- giving him the lead 4-0 at the break.  Around a minute and a half through the second period, Mongush threw Uguev to his back for four points, evening the score: 4-4; although, Uguev would later throw Mongush for five-points, gaining the lead by the score 9-4.  Mongush would shortly after make Uguev step-out, resulting in a 9-5 score; however, it would be too late as Uguev was able to hold the score until the final whistle and conclusion of the match.  Having beat Mongush, Uguev became the 2021 Russian National Champion, he would be one of three wrestlers from Dagestan, and be the 57 kg representative of the Russian Freestyle team at the 2021 Olympics.

Freestyle record

! colspan="7"| International Freestyle Matches
|-
!  Res.
!  Record
!  Opponent
!  Score
!  Date
!  Event
!  Location
|-
! style=background:white colspan=7 |
|-
|Win
|83–9
|align=left| Ravi Kumar Dahiya
|style="font-size:88%"|7–4
|style="font-size:88%" rowspan=4|August 4–5, 2021
|style="font-size:88%" rowspan=4|2020 Summer Olympics
|style="text-align:left;font-size:88%;" rowspan=4|
 Tokyo, Japan
|-
|Win
|82–9
|align=left| Reza Atri
|style="font-size:88%"|8–3
|-
|Win
|81–9
|align=left| Gulomjon Abdullaev
|style="font-size:88%"|6–6
|-
|Win
|80–9
|align=left| Thomas Gilman
|style="font-size:88%"|5–4
|-
! style=background:white colspan=7 |
|-
|Win
|79–9
|align=left| David Gonzalez
|style="font-size:88%"|TF
|style="font-size:88%"|June 19, 2021
|style="font-size:88%"|2021 Sassari City International
|style="text-align:left;font-size:88%;"|
 Sassari, Italy
|-
! style=background:white colspan=7 | 
|-
|Win
|78–9
|align=left| Nachyn Mongush
|style="font-size:88%"|9–5
|style="font-size:88%" rowspan=5|March 11–12, 2021
|style="font-size:88%" rowspan=5|2021 Russian National Freestyle Wrestling Championships
|style="text-align:left;font-size:88%;" rowspan=5|
 Ulan-Ude, Russia
|-
|Win
|77–9
|align=left| Belek-ool Kuzhuget
|style="font-size:88%"|4–1
|-
|Win
|76–9
|align=left| Donduk-ool Khuresh-ool
|style="font-size:88%"|2–1
|-
|Win
|75–9
|align=left| Abubakar Mutaliev
|style="font-size:88%"|TF 10–0
|-
|Win
|74–9
|align=left| Umar Khachukaev
|style="font-size:88%"|TF 10–0
|-
! style=background:white colspan=7 | 
|-
|Win
|73-9
|align=left| Arsen Harutyunyan
|style="font-size:88%"|TF 10-0
|style="font-size:88%" rowspan=5|December 16–18, 2020
|style="font-size:88%" rowspan=5|2020 Individual Wrestling World Cup
|style="text-align:left;font-size:88%;" rowspan=5|
 Belgrade, Serbia
|-
|Win
|72-9
|align=left| Rahman Amouzad
|style="font-size:88%"|Fall
|-
|Win
|71-9
|align=left| Bekbolot Myrzanazar uulu
|style="font-size:88%"|9-0
|-
|Win
|70-9
|align=left| Uladzislau Andreyeu
|style="font-size:88%"|TF 11-0
|-
|Win
|69-9
|align=left| Anatolii Buruian
|style="font-size:88%"|TF 11-0
|-
! style=background:white colspan=7 | 
|-
|Win
|68-9
|align=left| Azamat Tuskaev
|style="font-size:88%"|1-1
|style="font-size:88%" rowspan=4|October 16–18, 2020
|style="font-size:88%" rowspan=4|2020 Russian National Freestyle Wrestling Championships
|style="text-align:left;font-size:88%;" rowspan=4|
 Naro-Fominsk, Russia
|-
|Win
|67-9
|align=left| Muslim Sadulaev
|style="font-size:88%"|TF 10-0
|-
|Win
|66-9
|align=left| Aleksey Kopylov
|style="font-size:88%"|TF 10-0
|-
|Win
|65-9
|align=left| Petr Konstantinov
|style="font-size:88%"|TF 10-0
|-
! style=background:white colspan=7 |
|-
|Win
|64-9
|align=left| Süleyman Atlı
|style="font-size:88%"|TF 13-3
|style="font-size:88%" rowspan=5|September 19–20, 2019
|style="font-size:88%" rowspan=5|2019 World Wrestling Championships
|style="text-align:left;font-size:88%;" rowspan=5|
 Nur-Sultan, Kazakhstan
|-
|Win
|63-9
|align=left| Ravi Kumar Dahiya
|style="font-size:88%"|6-4
|-
|Win
|62-9
|align=left| Reza Atri
|style="font-size:88%"|2-0
|-
|Win
|61-9
|align=left| Erdenebatyn Bekhbayar
|style="font-size:88%"|5-2
|-
|Win
|60-9
|align=left| Mahir Amiraslanov
|style="font-size:88%"|4-3
|-
|Win
|59-9
|align=left| Aryan Tyutrin
|style="font-size:88%"|TF 10-0
|style="font-size:88%"|August 16, 2019
|style="font-size:88%"|2019 Russian World Team Wrestle-offs
|style="text-align:left;font-size:88%;"|
 Sochi, Russia
|-
! style=background:white colspan=7 | 
|-
|Win
|58-9
|align=left| Georgi Vangelov
|style="font-size:88%"|10-2
|style="font-size:88%" rowspan=4|June 25–26, 2019
|style="font-size:88%" rowspan=4|2019 European Games
|style="text-align:left;font-size:88%;" rowspan=4|
 Minsk, Belarus
|-
|Loss
|57-9
|align=left| Mahir Amiraslanov
|style="font-size:88%"|2-3
|-
|Win
|57-8
|align=left| Garik Barseghyan
|style="font-size:88%"|TF 10-0
|-
|Win
|56-8
|align=left| Alexandru Chirtoacă
|style="font-size:88%"|TF 11-0
|-
! style=background:white colspan=7 | 
|-
|Win
|55-8
|align=left| Azamat Tuskaev
|style="font-size:88%"|3-0
|style="font-size:88%" rowspan=5|May 1–3, 2019
|style="font-size:88%" rowspan=5|2019 Ali Aliev International
|style="text-align:left;font-size:88%;" rowspan=5|
 Kaspiysk, Russia
|-
|Win
|54-8
|align=left| Reineri Andreu
|style="font-size:88%"|9-0
|-
|Win
|53-8
|align=left| Giorgi Edisherashvili
|style="font-size:88%"|TF 10-0
|-
|Win
|52-8
|align=left| Wanhao Zou
|style="font-size:88%"|8-4
|-
|Win
|51-8
|align=left| Parviz Ibrahimov
|style="font-size:88%"|2-0
|-
! style=background:white colspan=7 |
|-
|Win
|50-8
|align=left| Nurislam Sanayev
|style="font-size:88%"|4-3
|style="font-size:88%" rowspan=4|October 21–22, 2018
|style="font-size:88%" rowspan=4|2018 World Wrestling Championships
|style="text-align:left;font-size:88%;" rowspan=4|
 Budapest, Hungary
|-
|Win
|49-8
|align=left| Yuki Takahashi
|style="font-size:88%"|7-2
|-
|Win
|48-8
|align=left| Reineri Andreu
|style="font-size:88%"|6-0
|-
|Win
|47-8
|align=left| Mihran Jaburyan
|style="font-size:88%"|TF 10-0
|-
! style=background:white colspan=7 | 
|-
|Win
|46-8
|align=left| Donduk-ool Khuresh-ool
|style="font-size:88%"|7-1
|style="font-size:88%" rowspan=3|August 3–5, 2018
|style="font-size:88%" rowspan=3|2018 Russian National Freestyle Wrestling Championships
|style="text-align:left;font-size:88%;" rowspan=3|
 Odintsovo, Russia
|-
|Win
|45-8
|align=left| Ismail Gadzhiev
|style="font-size:88%"|3-0
|-
|Win
|44-8
|align=left| Rasul Mashezov
|style="font-size:88%"|TF 12-0
|-
! style=background:white colspan=7 | 
|-
|Loss
|43-8
|align=left| Giorgi Edisherashvili
|style="font-size:88%"|3-5
|style="font-size:88%" rowspan=4|May 4–5, 2018
|style="font-size:88%" rowspan=4|2018 European Wrestling Championships
|style="text-align:left;font-size:88%;" rowspan=4|
 Kaspiysk, Russia
|-
|Win
|43-7
|align=left| Levan Metreveli
|style="font-size:88%"|TF 10-0
|-
|Win
|42-7
|align=left| Zoheir El-Ouarraqe
|style="font-size:88%"|6-0
|-
|Win
|41-7
|align=left| Stevan Mićić
|style="font-size:88%"|6-4
|-
! style=background:white colspan=7 | 
|-
|Win
|40-7
|align=left| Zoheir El-Ouarraqe
|style="font-size:88%"|6-5
|style="font-size:88%" rowspan=4|March 22–25, 2018
|style="font-size:88%" rowspan=4|2018 Dan Kolov - Nikola Petrov Memorial
|style="text-align:left;font-size:88%;" rowspan=4|
 Sofia, Bulgaria
|-
|Win
|39-7
|align=left| Barış Kaya
|style="font-size:88%"|TF 11-1
|-
|Win
|38-7
|align=left| Roberti Dingashvili
|style="font-size:88%"|TF 11-0
|-
|Win
|37-7
|align=left| Andreyeu Uladzislau
|style="font-size:88%"|TF 11-0
|-
! style=background:white colspan=7 | 
|-
|Win
|36-7
|align=left| Azamat Tuskaev
|style="font-size:88%"|4-1
|style="font-size:88%" rowspan=4|January 26, 2018
|style="font-size:88%" rowspan=4|Golden Grand Prix Ivan Yarygin 2018
|style="text-align:left;font-size:88%;" rowspan=4|
 Krasnoyarsk, Russia
|-
|Win
|35-7
|align=left| Frank Perrelli
|style="font-size:88%"|8-3
|-
|Win
|34-7
|align=left| Donduk-ool Khuresh-ool
|style="font-size:88%"|6-3
|-
|Win
|33-7
|align=left| Tumentsogt Bold
|style="font-size:88%"|8-0
|-
! style=background:white colspan=7 | 
|-
|Win
|32-7
|align=left| Uluk Joldoshbekov
|style="font-size:88%"|TF 10-0
|style="font-size:88%" rowspan=3|November 25–26, 2017
|style="font-size:88%" rowspan=3|2017 D. A. Kunaev Memorial
|style="text-align:left;font-size:88%;" rowspan=3|
 Taras, Kazakhstan
|-
|Win
|31-7
|align=left| Berdakh Primbayev
|style="font-size:88%"|TF 11-0
|-
|Win
|30-7
|align=left| Marat Garipov
|style="font-size:88%"|TF 12-0
|-
! style=background:white colspan=7 | 
|-
|Loss
|29-7
|align=left| Azamat Tuskaev
|style="font-size:88%"|4-7
|style="font-size:88%" rowspan=3|November 17–19, 2017
|style="font-size:88%" rowspan=3|2017 Alans International
|style="text-align:left;font-size:88%;" rowspan=3|
 Vladikavkaz, Russia
|-
|Win
|29-6
|align=left| Artyom Gebekov
|style="font-size:88%"|5-2
|-
|Win
|28-6
|align=left| Mihran Jaburyan
|style="font-size:88%"|TF 10-0
|-
! style=background:white colspan=7 | 
|-
|Win
|27-6
|align=left| Abasgadzhi Magomedov
|style="font-size:88%"|6-3
|style="font-size:88%" rowspan=4|October 12–13, 2017
|style="font-size:88%" rowspan=4|2017 International Cup
|style="text-align:left;font-size:88%;" rowspan=4|
 Khasavyurt, Russia
|-
|Win
|26-6
|align=left| Said Gazimagomedov
|style="font-size:88%"|4-0
|-
|Win
|25-6
|align=left| Ismail Gadzhiev
|style="font-size:88%"|6-1
|-
|Win
|24-6
|align=left| Magomedrasul Magomedov
|style="font-size:88%"|6-0
|-
! style=background:white colspan=7 | 
|-
|Loss
|23-6
|align=left| Sandeep Tomar
|style="font-size:88%"|2-8
|style="font-size:88%" |August 25, 2017
|style="font-size:88%" |2017 World Wrestling Championships
|style="text-align:left;font-size:88%;" |
 Paris, France
|-
! style=background:white colspan=7 | 
|-
|Win
|23-5
|align=left| Artem Gebekov
|style="font-size:88%"|3-1
|style="font-size:88%" rowspan=5|June 13, 2017
|style="font-size:88%" rowspan=5|2017 Russian National Freestyle Wrestling Championships
|style="text-align:left;font-size:88%;" rowspan=5|
 Nazran, Russia
|-
|Win
|22-5
|align=left| Dmitriy Aksenov
|style="font-size:88%"|7-1
|-
|Win
|21-5
|align=left| Rasul Mashezov
|style="font-size:88%"|TF 10-0
|-
|Win
|20-5
|align=left| Aryaan Tyutrin
|style="font-size:88%"|3-0
|-
|Win
|19-5
|align=left| Ramazan Ferzaliev
|style="font-size:88%"|TF 14-4
|-
! style=background:white colspan=7 | 
|-
|Win
|18-5
|align=left| Zoheir El-Ouarraqe
|style="font-size:88%"|9-1
|style="font-size:88%" rowspan=4|May 2, 2017
|style="font-size:88%" rowspan=4|2017 European Wrestling Championships
|style="text-align:left;font-size:88%;" rowspan=4|
 Novi Sad, Serbia
|-
|Loss
|17-5
|align=left| Giorgi Edisherashvili
|style="font-size:88%"|1-5
|-
|Win
|17-4
|align=left| Andriy Yatsenko
|style="font-size:88%"|Fall
|-
|Win
|16-4
|align=left| Vladimir Egorov
|style="font-size:88%"|5-3
|-
! style=background:white colspan=7 | 
|-
|Loss
|15-4
|align=left| Süleyman Atlı
|style="font-size:88%"|5-7
|style="font-size:88%" |March 10–12, 2017
|style="font-size:88%" |2017 Yaşar Doğu
|style="text-align:left;font-size:88%;" |
 Istanbul, Turkey
|-
! style=background:white colspan=7 | 
|-
|Win
|15-3
|align=left| Artem Gebekov
|style="font-size:88%"|TF 10-0
|style="font-size:88%" rowspan=5|January 27, 2017
|style="font-size:88%" rowspan=5|Golden Grand Prix Ivan Yarygin 2017
|style="text-align:left;font-size:88%;" rowspan=5|
 Krasnoyarsk, Russia
|-
|Win
|14-3
|align=left| Nariman Israpilov
|style="font-size:88%"|8-3
|-
|Win
|13-3
|align=left| Aryaan Tyutrin
|style="font-size:88%"|8-2
|-
|Win
|12-3
|align=left| Nurtilek Ermekbaev
|style="font-size:88%"|TF 12-1
|-
|Win
|11-3
|align=left| Magomedrasul Idrisov
|style="font-size:88%"|TF 11-0
|-
! style=background:white colspan=7 | 
|-
|Win
|10-3
|align=left| Vladimir Kudrin
|style="font-size:88%"|10-7
|style="font-size:88%" rowspan=5|November 26–27, 2016
|style="font-size:88%" rowspan=5|2016 D. A. Kunaev Memorial
|style="text-align:left;font-size:88%;" rowspan=5|
 Taras, Kazakhstan
|-
|Win
|9-3
|align=left| Donduk-ool Khuresh-ool
|style="font-size:88%"|6-3
|-
|Loss
|8-3
|align=left| Zhandos Ismailov
|style="font-size:88%"|Fall
|-
|Win
|8-2
|align=left| Khasankhusein Badrudinov
|style="font-size:88%"|4-2
|-
|Win
|7-2
|align=left| Margulan Zhussupov
|style="font-size:88%"|1-0
|-
! style=background:white colspan=7 | 
|-
|Win
|6-2
|align=left| Magomedrasul Idrisov
|style="font-size:88%"|
|style="font-size:88%" rowspan=4|October 14–16, 2016
|style="font-size:88%" rowspan=4|2016 International Cup
|style="text-align:left;font-size:88%;" rowspan=4|
 Khasavyurt, Russia
|-
|Win
|5-2
|align=left| Ramazan Ferzaliev
|style="font-size:88%"|11-4
|-
|Win
|4-2
|align=left| Nico Megaludis
|style="font-size:88%"|4-3
|-
|Win
|3-2
|align=left| Aidarbek Baymuratov
|style="font-size:88%"|3-0
|-
! style=background:white colspan=7 | 
|-
|Loss
|2-2
|align=left| Ulukbek Zholdoshbekov
|style="font-size:88%"|3-9
|style="font-size:88%" rowspan=4|July 1–3, 2016
|style="font-size:88%" rowspan=4|2016 Ali Aliev International
|style="text-align:left;font-size:88%;" rowspan=4|
 Makhachkala, Russia
|-
|Loss
|2-1
|align=left| Artem Gebekov
|style="font-size:88%"|4-5
|-
|Win
|2-0
|align=left| Parviz Ibrahimov
|style="font-size:88%"|3-1
|-
|Win
|1-0
|align=left| Baimuratov Aidarbek
|style="font-size:88%"|TF 13-2
|-

References

External links

 
 
 

1995 births
Living people
People from Khasavyurt
Kumyks
Russian male sport wrestlers
World Wrestling Champions
European Games bronze medalists for Russia
Wrestlers at the 2019 European Games
European Games medalists in wrestling
European Wrestling Championships medalists
Wrestlers at the 2020 Summer Olympics
Olympic gold medalists for the Russian Olympic Committee athletes
Olympic medalists in wrestling
Medalists at the 2020 Summer Olympics
Olympic wrestlers of Russia
Sportspeople from Dagestan
21st-century Russian people